The Magic of Music is a Canadian children's classical music television series which aired on CBC Television from 1955 to 1958.

Premise
This series taught classical music theory and history for children.

Scheduling
This half-hour series was broadcast on Tuesday afternoons for three seasons: 22 November 1955 to 10 April 1956 (4:30 p.m., alternate weeks), 22 January to 16 April 1957 (5:00 p.m. weekly) and 1 April to 24 June 1958 (5:00 p.m. weekly).

References

External links
 

CBC Television original programming
1955 Canadian television series debuts
1958 Canadian television series endings
1950s Canadian children's television series
1950s Canadian music television series
Black-and-white Canadian television shows